Kervin Doran Wyatt (born October 17, 1957) is a former American football offensive lineman and linebacker who played one season in the National Football League (NFL) for the New York Giants.

Early life and education
Wyatt was born on October 17, 1957, in Washington, D.C. He attended Potomac High School in Maryland, before playing college football at the University of Maryland. Wyatt originally played at offensive lineman. He was a varsity member in all four years at the school.

Professional career
Despite having never played the position before, Wyatt was signed by the New York Giants as a linebacker following the 1980 NFL Draft. He was injured in a scrimmage against the New England Patriots on August 1, and subsequently placed on injured reserve. He was activated prior to their game against the St. Louis Cardinals, following an injury to John Skorupan. Wyatt appeared in the final four games of the season, starting three.

References

1957 births
Living people
American football offensive linemen
American football linebackers
Players of American football from Washington, D.C.
Maryland Terrapins football players
New York Giants players